Adam Dechanel (born 1978 London) is a British author, illustrator, graphic designer and producer.

Life
He has worked in television, film, books, short stories and graphic novels for many years.
He graduated from Camberwell School of Art, and immediately began working in graphic design for Zomba Records and quickly followed on with work for the BBC and Channel 4. He has had a series of novels published including several based around DC Comics properties. Adam has also worked extensively over the years with Warner Bros., Marvel, DC Comics and The Walt Disney Company.  He also exhibits his artwork in galleries around London, including the prestigious Old Truman Brewery. Adam has also been a journalist on comic, television and movie properties for the Superman Homepage for many years. Adam co-wrote the multiple path series: The Interactive Adventures Of Superman before writing and illustrating the novel Superman: Tempered Steel. Adam is a regular exhibitor at London based WAMCT Conventions.

In publishing, he is the co-creator along with noted producer/director Simon James Collier, of publishing label Okai Collier Kids that pioneered the flash animation based CDbook entertainment format which has gone on to publish over fourteen acclaimed novels and picture books for the digital generation.

His educational project concepts for the graphic novel anthologies, Vanston Place: The Secret Adventures & The Timber Wharves Gang earning him a nomination for a SNAC award. Adam's family novel The Legend Of Mauritius won him the prestigious Palace Leisure award.

In theatre, forging a partnership with Evcol entertainment, Adam has worked on hit shows such as Stephen Sondheim's "Passion, A… My Name Is Alice", and also spearheaded campaigns for the critically acclaimed European premieres of "Preacherosity" & the Hollywood legend Ossie Davis penned "Purlie: The Musical". He also wrote a standout script, "A Wrongful Execution", which was one of the headlining plays in the Inspiration, Innovation, Integration Season in Hackney Empire. "A Wrongful Execution" premiered the day of the July 7th London terrorist attacks dedicating itself to the memory of those lost that day.

In radio, Adam wrote and produced the audio adventure series 'Chip One' he also recorded the pilot for Education Of A Superhero - which proved so successful it also launched a series of cast diaries which were performed by West End veterans Omar F. Okai (Five Guys Named Moe, Ruthless, Purlie), Nathan Amzi (Rocky Horror Picture Show), Elise Audeyev (Mrs. Henderson Presents) and recording artist, Lisa Jayne.

Adam continues to write for comics, television and theatre.

In collaboration with Angelic Inspiration Entertainment he brought the novel (and inspiration for
the Anthony Hopkins/Emma Thompson movie of the same name) The Remains Of The Day to the London stage this was followed shortly after by musical horror 1888.

In 2013 Adam adapted Rudyard Kipling classic The Jungle Book as an immersive family show that went back to the original books for The Lion & Unicorn Theatre. It won a Family Theatre Award.
In 2014 Adam wrote a Gothic Trilogy reworkings of classic stories Frankenstein, The Corruption Of Dorian Gray and Jekyll & Hyde Corpus Delicti

2016 saw the launch of 'Welcome To The Planet' a weekly column on the world of comics & graphic novels in collaboration with Stefan Blitz and Forces Of Geek

Works
 The Education Of A Superhero, Clockwork Comics, 2007, 
 The Gifted: The Beast Within, Clockwork Comics, 2007, 
 The Keeper (Special Edition) - 
 Norman Under The Sea - 
 George The Germ - 
 The Rise & Fall Of Georgina Germ - 
 Towards The Light Fantastic: The Fight For Freedom - 
 Towards The Light Fantastic: Journey To Jaipur - 
 The Mr Dark Chronicles: Book One - 
 The Mr Dark Chronicles: Book Two - 
 The Mr Dark Chronicles: Book Three - 
 The Mr Dark Chronicles Special Collector's Edition - 
 Countess & Cabbages - 
 Norman And The Homeless - 
 Norman And The Mystery Of Howling Woods - 
 Spooky Noises -

Interviews
The Voice
The Guardian
My Village
Comicbook Resources

Awards and nominations
Winner - London Horror Award for The Lion & Unicorn Gothic Trilogy
Winner - Best Family Show 2013/14 - Family Theatre Award
Winner - Best Original Children's Novel - Palace Leisure Award
Winner  - Pulse Award
Nomination - Peter Brook/Equity Ensemble Award
Nomination - SNAC awards
Nomination - 123P Writer To Watch

Television appearances
Light Lunch - Channel 4
The Museum - BBC Television
Mortal Monday DC/Midway event - BBC Television
Disney Choice Awards
Smash Hits PWP
MTV Play UK

References

 http://www.kentishtowner.co.uk/2014/06/09/wrote-corruption-dorian-gray/
 http://www.bleedingcool.com/2011/11/17/preview-adam-dechanels-education-of-a-superhero/

External links
 Adam Dechanel's Facebook
 Adam Dechanel's Official Twitter
 Adam Dechanel's Official Portfolio
 Clockwork Digital Studios
 Warner Bros
 The Okai Collier Company
 DC Comics
 Superman Homepage
 Angelic Inspiration Entertainment

1978 births
Artists from London
Alumni of Camberwell College of Arts
British comics artists
Living people